Järstorp is a locality situated in Jonköping, Jönköping County, Sweden.

References 

Populated places in Jönköping County